The Midwest International Piano Competition is a piano competition held biannually at the University of Northern Iowa School of Music since 2014. It awards more than $25,000 in prize money, with a first prize of $10,000, and has two categories: Senior for up to 32 years old and Junior for up to 17 years old. The jury members of the inaugural competition included Arthur Greene, Alexander Toradze, and Miroslav Brejcha.

Prize winners

Senior category

Junior category

References

External links 
 

Piano competitions in the United States